John Erskine (September 13, 1813 – January 27, 1895) was a United States district judge of the United States District Court for the Northern District of Georgia and the United States District Court for the Southern District of Georgia.

Education and career

Born on September 13, 1813, in Strabane, County Tyrone, Ireland, Erskine read law in 1846. He entered private practice in Florida from 1846 to 1855. He continued private practice in Newnan, Georgia starting in 1855, and in Atlanta, Georgia until 1865.

Federal judicial service

Erksine received a recess appointment from President Andrew Johnson on July 10, 1865, to a joint seat on the United States District Court for the Northern District of Georgia and the United States District Court for the Southern District of Georgia vacated by Judge John Cochran Nicoll. He was nominated to the same position by President Johnson on December 20, 1865. He was confirmed by the United States Senate on January 22, 1866, and received his commission the same day. He was reassigned to serve only in the Southern District on April 25, 1882. His service terminated on December 1, 1883, due to his retirement.

Death

Erskine died on January 27, 1895, in Atlanta. The following year, the Erskine Memorial Fountain, the first public fountain in Atlanta, was dedicated in his honor. The fountain is today located in Grant Park.

References

Sources
 

1813 births
1895 deaths
Judges of the United States District Court for the Northern District of Georgia
Judges of the United States District Court for the Southern District of Georgia
United States federal judges appointed by Andrew Johnson
19th-century American judges
19th-century American politicians
United States federal judges admitted to the practice of law by reading law
People from Strabane
Irish emigrants to the United States (before 1923)